This article lists significant fatal, injury-only, and other accidents involving railway rolling stock, including crashes, fires and other incidents in the Australian state of South Australia. The first known incident in this list occurred in 1873 in Smithfield, South Australia.

Orroroo 1901 two killed in head on collision between cattle train and goods train

Fatal accidents

Glanville, 1880 
On 23 September 1880 a woman was run over and killed by an engine at Glanville. She was walking towards the station at Glanville close to the line and within a very short distance of the platform.

Dry Creek, 1890 
On 21 July 1890, James Cowan, a member of the South Australian Parliament, and his fellow passenger, Mark Bullimore, the local branch manager of the General Electric Supply Company of Australia, were both killed when a train collided with Cowan’s horse-drawn buggy at the intersection of Grand Junction Road and the main railway line running north from Adelaide in the suburb of Dry Creek.

Walloway, 1901 
On 16 November 1901, two people were killed. The accident was sufficient to condemn in the most scathing terms those who were responsible for the inefficient brake system. There were absolutely no lights to show the driver that he was approaching the station.

Fords, 1913 
On 13 February 1913 there was a washaway near Fords. An engine and several trucks were derailed. The engine driver was washed away and drowned.

Mile End, 1924 
On 8 January 1924 a woman who was knocked down and killed at the Mile-End crossing by a train bound for Sleep's Hill.

Cutana, 1928 
On 15 February 1928 the fireman of a goods train travelling on the narrow gauge Broken Hill line was crushed to death as the result of a washaway. The fireman of the train was killed.

Copley, 1944 
On 11 May 1944, four people killed. A goods train ran into the rear of a halted troop train at Copley, 604 km north of Adelaide, telescoping the rear cars and resulting in 4 deaths and 27 injuries. The troop train, consisting of 16 carriages, 4 fully laden goods trucks and a brake van, was pulled by a T class loco. However, the consist was too heavy for the loco, and it had problems with its injectors after climbing a steep hill. The loco was low on water, and uncoupled from the train to 'run light' to the nearest watering spot and refill. While it was away, the goods train entered the same section of track and struck the rear of the troop train. Only the fact that many troops were lying down saved them from serious injury and decapitation, as the tops of several carriages were shorn off in the impact.

Port Germein, 1947 
On 10 October 1947, five people killed. The five men, all of[sic] Whyalla, were killed instantly and another critically injured when the motor buck-board in which they were travelling from Port Pirie to Whyalla was wrecked by a mixed train at a railway crossing on the Port Pirie-Port Augusta road, about a quarter of a mile from Port Germein. The train, which was travelling from Port Augusta to Port Pirie, struck the buckboard with great force, smashing it to pieces and hurling the occupants many yards along the line.

Cavan, 1948 
On 19 December 1948, five people killed when a railway engine and tender hit a tourer car broadside. The dead included a woman (wife of the driver), their three daughters and another relative.

Paratoo, 1960 
On 27 December 1960 the driver of the Broken Hill Express was killed in a derailment caused by buckled rails.

Middleton, 1966 
On 10 October 1966, five people killed. A memorial was subsequently set up on the coastal road between Noarlunga and Moana, 'To the five surfers G. TOMS J. REORDAN M. LAVER G. RODDA J. MARTIN tragically killed 10 Oct 1966 Middleton level crossing. Remembered by their friends.'

Wasleys Crossing (Gawler), 1970 
On 12 April 1970, 17 people killed and forty-five injured when A double-decker bus crashed into the side of a two-carriage 'Bluebird' passenger train at Wasleys Crossing, near Gawler.

Direk, 1988
On 8 February 1988 1 Female Passenger and Driver were killed when the BuddCar collided with a Semi Trailer.
The driver and a passenger was killed in after a level crossing accident at Heaslip Road at Direk it was never repaired and was scrapped in the end so that only two remained then. The one at the NRM at Port Adelaide CB1 was the other car running with CB3 at the time and the dents can still be seen now in that car on one end of it. The other side of the car in the photo had a gash in it that went about half way through the car somewhere near the radiator area. The cars hit a semi trailer and the trailer on the semi whipped around and gouged through the car killing the passenger, the driver died on impact from memory

Adelaide, 1990 
On 6 June 1990 a man was killed while crossing and not hearing an approaching train.

Salisbury, 2002 
On 24 October 2002, four people were killed when The Ghan interstate passenger train (4AL8) a bus carrying schoolchildren and a car collided at a level crossing.

Virginia, 2007 
On 16 November 2007, two people killed. A small passenger van drove into the path of a Patrick Portlink freight train (6117) at the Moloney Road passive level crossing near Virginia. As a result of the collision, the two occupants in the van were fatally injured. The locomotive crew were shaken but not hurt. The train sustained minor damage but the van was destroyed, the level crossing was closed after another accident two weeks later.

Bumbunga, 2009 
At about 1535 on Saturday 1 August 2009, the lead locomotive of Pacific National (PN) freight train 5PM5 collided with a utility motor vehicle at the Bumbunga level crossing. The utility vehicle was seriously damaged as a result of the collision and the male driver and a female passenger were fatally injured.

The man and woman who died were in a car on the Lochiel–Blyth road when an Adelaide-bound freight train hit the vehicle just before 4 pm, killing them instantly. The SA-registered, late-model Ford Falcon Utility was split in two. The front half slid across the road and remained near the crossing on its roof. When the train halted  from impact, a car door was still lodged in the train's front. The crossing, near the entrance to the Snowtown–Bumbunga road, had no boomgates or flashing lights.

According to Adelaide Now (2009), 33 people had died in SA level-crossing collisions and another 71 were seriously injured since 2001.

Nantawarra, 2010 
At about 1303 on Saturday 22 May 2010, freight train 7MP7 collided with a young male child on the track adjacent to a level crossing near Nantawarra in the mid-north of South Australia. The child was fatally injured as a result of the collision. The investigation found that prior to the collision the child had wandered away from the family home and had unknowingly placed himself in a place of extreme danger on the railway track and there was little the train drivers could do to avoid the collision.

Weeroona Island, 2012 
On 19 March 2012 there was a fatal crash near Port Pirie in South Australia between a car and a freight train. The crash happened about 9:45am ACDT on Port Flinders Causeway at Weeroona Island, off National Highway One, about seven kilometres north of Port Pirie.

Mallala, 2020 
At about 3pm on Thursday 27 February 2020, Pacific National freight train 3PM7 collided with a four-wheel drive containing two adults on the track adjacent to a private level crossing near Mallala Road, south of Mallala in the south-east of South Australia. The investigation found that prior to the collision, the local couple were on their way to drop off their dog before going on a holiday, the crossing they approached had no warning signals or barriers to indicate an approaching train. The two adults were fatally injured as a result of the collision.

Culburra, 2020 
At about 12:30pm on Sunday 19 April 2020, freight train 5PM5 collided with a truck containing an adult male on the track adjacent to the level crossing near Culburra in the south-east of South Australia. The adult truck driver was fatally injured as a result of the collision.

Winninowie, 2022

Clarence Park, 2022 
Woman killed at pedestrian crossing by an Adelaide bound train after trying to save her dog which entered the rail corridor.

Oaklands, 2023 

Woman killed instantly at a pedestrian crossing by a Seaford bound train.

East Grange, 2023 

On Wednesday the 1st of March, a 74 year old woman was hit by an Adelaide bound train while crossing the line at East Grange railway station, died in hospital two days later.

Accidents involving injuries only

Adelaide Hills, 1886 
On 26 April 1886, a train bringing home many racegoers from the Balhannah races was wrecked at 16-Mile Siding in the Adelaide Hills. There were over 500 passengers on the train. Three of the train crew sustained injuries.

Bowden, 1895 
On 10 June 1895 a boy was knocked down and injured by a train at a level crossing in Bowden.

Brachina, 1911 
On 28 January 1911 a section of the permanent way was washed away in a local flood. A mixed train came upon the broken section of line and was derailed. The engine driver was killed and the fireman was injured; however, passengers and the guard escaped injury.

Cudmore Hill, 1914 
ON 28 March 1914 a boiler of the second engine of the Quorn goods train that had departed from Port Augusta exploded with devastating effect. The explosion caused the train to derail. The fireman of the train was injured.

Callington, 1929 
On 27 December 1929 sixteen passengers were injured when the second division of the Melbourne–Adelaide express derailed.

Manoora, 1942 
On 26 September 1942 one passenger was hospitalised and four other passengers were treated at the scene when a Terowie to Adelaide passenger train derailed.

Strangeways, 1943 
On 19 February 1943 a fireman was seriously injured after a head-on collision between a goods train and a troop train north of Quorn.

Coomandook, 1945 
On 14 February 1945 a fireman and guard were slightly injured when a troop train collided head-on with a goods train.

Snowtown, 1945 
On 7 April 1945 a guard and two fireman were injured when two freight trains collided head-on in the railway yards.

Petwood, 1963 
On 24 August 1963 a runaway goods train derailed.

Monteith, 1975 
On 10 March 1975 32 people were injured in the derailment of "The Overland" express.

Crystal Brook, 1975 
On 24 October 1975 an engine-driver was injured when a goods train was derailed due to bridge being undermined and collapsing.

Port Augusta, 1987 
On 17 April 1987 two men were injured two crewless locomotives slipped their brakes, ran away and crashed head-on into parked diesels.

Redhill, 1989 
On 11 July 1989, 65 people were injured when the Australian National operated Adelaide-bound Indian Pacific collided with a packed passenger train standing on the Redhill railway siding. The two-car Silver City Express Limited, scheduled for Broken Hill, was at the end of the crossing loop, ready to move on to the main line, as soon as the transcontinental train passed in the opposite direction. But the Indian Pacific came on to the loop instead of continuing on the main line. The driver of the Broken Hill train leapt from his cabin seconds before the collision, pushing the Express Limited 50m down the track. Several seriously injured passengers were flown to Adelaide for emergency treatment, as teams of ambulance officers arrived by helicopter from the capital city to treat the injured. Despite the heavy impact, neither train was derailed & the Indian Pacific continued to Adelaide after a safety check. A board of inquiry set-up after the collision blamed the driver of the Indian Pacific for failing to heed 2 warning signals before ploughing head-on into the Express Limited.

Kyancutta, 1992 
On 14 December 1992, two people where injured when an Australian National grain train, powered by three diesel locos, collided with a fully laden semi-trailer, at a level crossing at Kyancutta.  The truck immediately burst into flame, but the three engine drivers risked their lives and pulled the two injured people free.  CFS staff cut the couplings to the front loco, which was on fire, and the drivers reversed the rest of the train from danger.

Mount Christie, 1997 
On 22 February 1997, five people were injured when a Melbourne-bound AN freighter collided with a Perth-bound NRC steel carrier collided on the main line near the Mount Christie railway siding, 130 km west of Tarcoola. Five crew members were injured and three AN Class and one EL Class locomotive were damaged. A remodelled CLP Class locomotive was destroyed. Rolling stock escaped damage.

Murrow Farm near Two Wells, 2007 
At about 1135 on Monday 6 August 2007, a loaded sewage truck drove into the path of the south-bound passenger train, The Ghan (7DA8), at the Murrow Farm level crossing near Two Wells. The driver of the truck was seriously injured and the truck was destroyed. The train's lead locomotive was severely damaged in the collision but the train driver was uninjured. Two minor injuries were recorded by passengers on the train and there was minor damage to the track.

Emerson, 2017 
At about 10:01pm on Wednesday 6 September 2017, a Mercedes-Benz sedan drove into the path of a passenger train, an Adelaide Metro electric train (4009), at the Black Forest level crossing near Clarence Gardens. The driver of the vehicle was seriously injured and the Mercedes-Benz was destroyed. The train's lead power car received minor damaged in the collision but the train driver was uninjured.

Two Wells, 2018 
On 25 June 2018 at about 2:30pm, a car collided with north-bound freight train 2MP5 on the Temby Road intersection, sliding into the side of the train travelling at approximately 100 km/h. The 55-year-old driver was treated at the scene for head lacerations and neck pain. The locomotive driver was uninjured. Minor repairs were made to the train and no track damage was reported.

Balhannah, 2021

Murray Bridge, 2021

Tambelin, 2023 

On 28th of February 2023 at 08:15, an 11 year old schoolboy was struck by an Adelaide bound train at Tambelin station.

Other accidents

Smithfield, 1873 
On 20 June 1873 a mechanical failure befell the engine hauling the Adelaide-Kapunda train near Smithfield. A tyre on the engine broke. The engine was derailed and goods and passenger wagons were smashed.

Mitcham, 1927 
On 9 March 1927 there was a rear-end collision between a goods train and the Adelaide express.

Fosters's Corner, Belair, 1929 
On 10 January 1929 21 wagons containing livestock became separate from a southbound goods train. The wagons careered downgrade and eventually derailed. No humans were injured although livestock were killed in the accident.

Mount Lofty, 1931 
On 28 March 1931 due to an incorrect points setting a passenger train from Adelaide to Bridgewater was directed down a dead-end siding where it crashed through the dead-end structure.

Ambleside, 1948 
On 14 August 1948 an Adelaide-bound goods train derailed near the end of the loop outside Ambleside yard. No one was injured.

Stockyard Creek, 1951 
On 19 October 1951 a passenger train struck a goods train from behind. No one was injured.

Tintinara, 1962 
On 3 July 1962 a goods train travelling from Melbourne to Adelaide was derailed. No one was injured.

Callington, 1972 
On 20 December 1972 The Mile End (Adelaide) to Tailem Bend goods train was derailed.

Jacobs Creek, 1977 
On 19 June 1977 a cement and stone train was derailed after striking three steers.

Balyarta, 1977 
On 22 July 1977 an overnight Adelaide-Melbourne express goods train derailed.

Renmark, 1980 
On 17 December 1980 a goods train was derailed.

Roopena, 2007 
At approximately 0428 on 22 May 2007, ballast train 3MR2 derailed near Roopena (between Whyalla and Port Augusta). The derailment occurred about 28 track kilometres north of Whyalla. Twenty seven ballast wagons were derailed but there were no injuries.

Birkenhead, 2008 
At about 1448 on Wednesday 5 March 2008, a double road-train loaded with bulk cement drove into the path of a train that was conveying four empty fuel tankers at the Stirling Street level crossing, Birkenhead. The impact speed of both the train and road-train was low (about 15 km/h) but nevertheless sufficient to roll the prime mover and the first semitrailer onto their sides and to derail the lead bogie of the train's locomotive. The road-train driver was slightly injured; the two train drivers were shaken but otherwise unhurt.

Bates, 2008 
At approximately 0650 on 19 April 2008, freight train 5PS6, travelling from Perth to Sydney, derailed near Bates. The derailment occurred about 13 track kilometres east of Bates. Thirteen wagons were derailed and about 800 m of track was damaged. There were no injuries.

Mount Christie, 2008 
At approximately 2130 on 1 September 2008, 13 wagons on freight train 1MP9, owned and operated by SCT Logistics (SCT), derailed near Mount Christie. There were no injuries, but about 4.5 km of track was damaged.

Keith, 2010 
At about 0415 on 8 October 2010, freight train 5MP5 travelling from Melbourne to Perth reported having derailed on the Defined Interstate Rail Network (DIRN) between Wirrega and Keith, South Australia.

Cadney Park, 2010 
At about 0618 on Thursday 25 November 2010, freight train 4DA2, operated by FreightLink Pty Ltd, derailed on the Central Australian Railway line just south of Cadney Park. There were no injuries as a result of the derailment but there was significant damage to rolling stock and about 300 m of track required renewal.

Dry Creek, 2011 
Initial reports indicated that at about 0105 on 11 October 2011 ore train 1901, travelling on the interstate main rail line, collided with grain train 5132 as the grain train was entering the Dry Creek rail yard in Adelaide. No person was injured but there was significant damage to rolling stock.

Adelaide, 2011 
At 1209 on 24 February 2011 a suburban commuter train (215A) with 17 passengers on board was being routed from the Up South Main Line into platform 5 at the Adelaide Station. At about the same time a second commuter train (G231) with 22 passengers on board that was departing the Adelaide Station passed signal 141 located at the end of platform 3 at low speed. Shortly thereafter both drivers realised that their trains would come into conflict and applied their train brakes but it was too late to avoid a collision. There were no injuries as a result of the collision; however, both trains sustained minor damage.

Port Augusta, 2011
At about 2016 on Friday 6 May 2011, freight train 4PM6 derailed the trailing bogie of the 49th wagon (RQHY 07069C) at Port Augusta near the Carlton Parade level crossing (91.559 km). About 1300 m later, the wagon re-railed itself as it entered the road pavement near the Stirling Road level crossing. There were no injuries as a result of the derailment but there was minor damage to rolling stock and track.

Fisher, 2011 
At about 0145 on Saturday 28 May 2011, intermodal freight train 5MP9 was travelling from Melbourne to Perth when it experienced a catastrophic failure of a locomotive wheel at about the 849.700 track kilometre mark near Fisher on the Nullarbor Plain. There were no injuries. The locomotive did not derail but separated wheel fragments damaged the locomotive traction motor and associated components. The single-line track incurred four rail breaks and broken sleepers over a distance of about 1 km.

Keswick, 2015 
At about 0800 on Tuesday 31 March 2015, a freight train entering the Keswick yards (2MP9) collided with the rear of another train (2MP1), derailing four wagons and blocking two level crossings for several hours.

Grange, 2022 

At approx. 6:30pm on 22 November 2022, 3102 (coupled to 3101) slid for 34 seconds and overshot the end of the line at Grange railway station. It ran over the buffer stop, through a fence and up over the footpath on Military Road narrowly missing cars and pedestrians. Luckily no one at the scene or on the train was injured. Passengers alighted and authorities were shortly on the scene. 3102 was placed back on the tracks by a large crane a few hours and towed by 3101 back to Adelaide. The next morning, both railcars were taken to Dry Creek for assessment. 3102 is believed to be retired.

Belair, 2023 

At 04:50 on Wednesday the 8th of August, PN Intermodal service 3MA5 suffered a minor derailment to one wagon when entering the crossing loop at Belair, closing the railway line for the day.

Two Wells, 2023 
At 1809 on Wednesday the 15th of February, Bowmans Rail's 1421S from Pelican Point to Bowmans derailed due to a heat buckle outside of Two Wells.

See also 
 List of rail accidents

References 

Accidents
South Australia